Hosmer Library, originally known as the Thirty-Sixth Street Branch Library, is a branch library of the Hennepin County Library system serving the Central neighborhood of Minneapolis, Minnesota, United States. It was named the Hosmer Library in honor of James Kendall Hosmer and was listed on the National Register of Historic Places in 2000.

History
It was built in 1916 during a period of rapid immigration into Minneapolis.  At the time it was built, the library was in a sparsely developed Scandinavian neighborhood and one block away from the since-demolished Central High School.  The library was built under the leadership of librarian Gratia Countryman and financed with support from the Carnegie Corporation. The building is in the Collegiate Gothic style, with polygonal towers on either side of the main entrance, a crenellated parapet, and terra cotta trim.

Hosmer Library was Minneapolis' fourth and final Carnegie branch. Following Gratia Countryman's research-based application to secure the funds from the Carnegie Corporation (she prepared a compelling summary of library circulation, and analyzed the city's residents, identifying demographic and ethnic patterns, resulting in tailored programming for each neighborhood's library), construction of the 90 by 54 foot building began in May 1914. Total costs ran to $27,700 for the plans designed by Henry D. Whitefield, a New York-based architect who was brother-in-law to Andrew Carnegie. The tenth library built  in Minneapolis, the Thirty-sixth Street Branch Library opened on March 8, 1916. Honoring James Kendall Hosmer, Minneapolis' second city librarian,  the branch was renamed for him in 1926. The two granite lion-dogs outside the entrance were donated by family of Mrs. Lewis Gillette. Branch libraries were conveniently located near streetcars and Hosmer was no exception. It is one of nine Minneapolis libraries still in existence which is directly attributed to the important contributions of Gratia Countryman in building the library infrastructure for the city. When built, Hosmer was situated in a neighborhood without many residents, and those who lived there were primarily Scandinavian. In 1969, reflecting the changing composition of the neighborhood, an African American reading room was dedicated in Hosmer to serve patrons. Today, it is one of eight Minneapolis public libraries which are listed as historic landmarks with the National Register of Historic Places.

Roy Woodstrom
For many years, Hosmer Head Librarian Roy Woodstrom was at the vanguard of innovation in delivering services to patrons. Following significant budget cuts in 2004, the City of Minneapolis elected to reduce libraries' hours of service. At Hosmer, open days dropped to four days a week. Neighbors rallied in 2004, when the Bancroft Neighborhood Association voted to give $7,000 to the Hosmer branch following a presentation by Woodstrom so that the library could be open five days a week. On behalf of Hosmer, Woodstrom explored becoming a 501(c)3 corporation, a non-profit, to raise the monies to grow the library's open days from four to five.  He successfully petitioned the Kingfield Neighborhood Association in October 2004 for a Social Services Grant in the amount of $5,000 towards for cultural and community programs.
 
Woodstrom launched the Hosmer World Music Concert Series in 2002 with weekly live music on Saturday afternoons. Funding comes from a variety of sources including the Minnesota Arts and Cultural Heritage Fund,  Metropolitan Regional Arts Council with additional support from Friends of the Hosmer Library and KFAI Radio.  Previously, Woodstrom developed the Hosmer Library Talent Show, a cherished annual event for the neighborhood's performers, which made its debut in 1998.  He also started the Hosmer Library Friends Group, which helps the branch meet patrons' needs through volunteerism, book sales, fundraising, and acting as liaisons between the library and the community.   His legacy also includes the World Film Series, hosted at the Library.  Woodstrom retired in 2014.

Updating the building
In 1951, an enclosure was added to the east side stairway for $900.  Recognizing the limited access of the building, a ground level entry and an elevator were added in 1980.  By 1996 it was determined that the building required a major overhaul to meet patrons' needs, and the Minneapolis Library Board considered closing Hosmer. Faced with that possibility, neighbors from Central, Bryant, Powderhorn Park and Kingfield banded together, and contributed more than $157,000 in Neighborhood Revitalization Program funds to ensure that their treasured library would stay open and get the necessary upgrades. They were successful: circulation rates were triple what they were before the remodeling, and Hosmer had ten times as many daily visitors. In August 2019, Hosmer Library was once again remodelled, adding dedicated Teen and Children's sections, as well as other improvements.

Tailored programs
K-12 Homework Help is a popular program for students in the neighborhood. Annually, the birthday of James Hosmer is celebrated at the branch with festivities and an exhibit about his important contributions to the city of Minneapolis libraries. 
Today, Hosmer remains a vital hub, serving the information needs of its patrons and the community with innovative, thoughtful and valued programs. A STEAM-based program called Teen Tech Squad is also offered at Hosmer

References

Carnegie libraries in Minnesota
Hennepin County Library
Libraries on the National Register of Historic Places in Minnesota
Library buildings completed in 1916
Minneapolis Public Library
National Register of Historic Places in Minneapolis
Public libraries in Minnesota
Libraries in Minnesota